Carola Lichey (born 30 March 1961) is a retired East German rower who won one gold, one silver and one bronze medal at the world championships of 1983–1986. In October 1986, she was awarded a Patriotic Order of Merit in gold (first class) for her sporting success.

References

External links
 

1961 births
Living people
German female rowers
World Rowing Championships medalists for East Germany
Recipients of the Patriotic Order of Merit in gold
Sportspeople from Brandenburg